The 2002 Iowa State Senate elections took place as part of the biennial 2002 United States elections. Iowa voters elected state senators in 35 of the state senate's 50 districts—all 25 of the odd-numbered seats were up for regularly-scheduled elections and, due to the oddities of redistricting following the 2000 Census, 10 of the even-numbered sears were up as well. State senators serve four-year terms in the Iowa State Senate, with half of the seats traditionally up for election each cycle.

The primary election on June 4, 2002 determined which candidates appeared on the November 5, 2002 general election ballot. Primary election results can be obtained here. General election results can be obtained here.

Following the previous 2000 Iowa Senate election, Republicans had control of the Iowa state Senate with 30 seats to Democrats' 20 seats. On March 12, 2002 a special election in district 10 resulted in Amanda Ragan flipping a seat in favor of the Democrats. Therefore, on election day in November 2002, Republicans controlled 29 seats and Democrats had 21.

To reclaim control of the chamber from Republicans, the Democrats needed to net 5 Senate seats.

Republicans maintained control of the Iowa State Senate following the 2002 general election with the balance of power remaining unchanged with Republicans holding 29 seats and Democrats having 21 seats.

Summary of Results
NOTE: 15 of the even-numbered districts did not have elections in 2002 so they are not listed here.
Also note, an asterisk (*) after a Senator's name indicates they were an incumbent re-elected, but to a new district number due to redistricting. 

Source:

Detailed Results
Reminder: All odd-numbered Iowa Senate seats were up for election in 2002 as well as 10 of the even-numbered seats due to redistricting following the 2000 Census. 15 of the even-numbered seats are not included here because they did not have elections in 2002.

Note: If a district does not list a primary, then that district did not have a competitive primary (i.e., there may have only been one candidate file for that district).

District 1

District 2

District 3

District 5

District 7

District 8

District 9

District 11

District 13

District 15

District 16

District 17

District 19

District 20

District 21

District 23

District 25

District 27

District 28

District 29

District 30

District 31

District 33

District 34

District 35

District 37

District 39

District 40

District 41

District 42

District 43

District 44

District 45

District 47

District 49

See also
 United States elections, 2002
 United States House of Representatives elections in Iowa, 2002
 Elections in Iowa

References

2002 Iowa elections
Iowa Senate elections
Iowa State Senate